The following lists events that happened during 1970 in the Union of Soviet Socialist Republics.

Incumbents
 General Secretary of the Communist Party of the Soviet Union: Leonid Brezhnev
 Premier of the Soviet Union: Alexei Kosygin
 Chairman of the Russian SFSR: Mikhail Yasnov

Events
 May 24 – The scientific drilling of the Kola Superdeep Borehole begins.
 June 1 – The two-man spacecraft Soyuz 9 is launched.
 June 15 – Operation Wedding: Fifteen refuseniks try to escape from the Soviet Union by hijacking a plane.
 October 6 – French President Georges Pompidou visits the Soviet Union.
 October 8 – Soviet author Aleksandr Solzhenitsyn is awarded the Nobel Prize in Literature.
 October 15 – The domestic Soviet Aeroflot Flight 244 is hijacked and diverted to Turkey.
 October 20 – The Zond 8 lunar probe is launched.
 November 9 – Luna 17 is launched.
 November 12 – Soviet author Andrei Amalrik is sentenced to three years imprisonment for 'anti-Soviet' writings.

Births
 January 2 – Oksana Omelianchik, artistic gymnast
 March 16 – Oleg Pavlov, writer (died 2018)
 August 26 – Olimpiada Ivanova, race walker

Deaths
 January 10 – Pavel Belyayev, Soviet cosmonaut (peritonitis; born 1925)
 June 11 (in the United States) – Alexander Kerensky, revolutionary and politician (born 1881)

References

See also
1970 in fine arts of the Soviet Union
List of Soviet films of 1971

 
1970s in the Soviet Union
Soviet Union
Soviet Union
Soviet Union